KHPE (107.9 FM, "Hope 107.9") is a Christian Contemporary radio station in Albany, Oregon, United States, broadcasting to the Albany–Corvallis–Lebanon, Salem, and Eugene–Springfield, Oregon areas, also known as the Willamette Valley area, on 107.9 FM.

Translators
KHPE is simulcast on the following translator:

History
KWIL-FM began broadcasting in 1969. It was the second KWIL-FM to operate; the first had begun broadcasting October 15, 1947, on 101.7 MHz, and was deleted August 21, 1956.

References

External links
Official Website

Contemporary Christian radio stations in the United States
Albany, Oregon
Radio stations established in 1969
1969 establishments in Oregon
HPE